This topic lists the Racquetball events for 2016.

World Championships and Continental Championships
 March 19–26: Pan American Championships in  San Luis Potosí
 Men's Singles:  Daniel De La Rosa def.  Jake Bredenbeck 15–2, 15–1.
 Men's Doubles:  Javier Moreno /  Alejandro Landa def.  Fernando Rios /  Jose Daniel Ugalde 15–11, 15–10.
 Women's Singles:  Paola Longoria def.  Frédérique Lambert 15–3, 15–6.
 Women's Doubles:  Paola Longoria /  Samantha Salas def.  Michelle Key /  Kelani Bailey 15–5, 15–10.
 Boys' Singles U14:  Jose Carlos Ramos Martinez def.  Ari Wiessbrott 15–1, 15–7.
 Boys' Singles U16:  Rodrigo Rodriguez def.  Eduardo Portillo 5–15, 15–7, 11–7.
 Women's Singles U14:  Guadalupe Griffin def.  Delia Alejandra Aguilar 15–5, 11–15, 11–8.
 Women's Doubles U16:  Monserrat de la Mejia /  Ana Laura Flores def.  Delia Alejandra Aguilar /   Guadalupe Griffin 15–8, 15–3.
 July 16–23: World Championships in  Cali
 Men's Singles:  Rocky Carson def.  Daniel de la Rosa 11-15, 15-5, 11-5.
 Women's Singles:  Paola Longoria def.  Ana Gabriela Martínez 15-12, 15-5.
 Men's Doubles:  Álvaro Beltrán / Javier Moreno def.  Jake Bredenbeck / Jose Diaz 15-12, 15-9.
 Women's Doubles:  Aimee Ruiz / Janel Tisinger
 August 29 – September 3: Senior World Championships in  Albuquerque
 Overall winners:  and 
 November 13–19: Junior World Championships n  San Luis Potosí
 Top three: 1. , 2. , 3.

2016 World Racquetball Tour

 February 18 – December 18: 2016 World Racquetball Tour
 February 18–21: WRT Mt Rainier Open in  Seattle
  Alejandro Cardona def.  Jake Bredenbeck 15-3, 15-10.
  Alejandro Cardona /  Gerardo Franco def.  Andree Parrilla /  David Horn, 15-9, 10-15, 11-6.
 April 21 – 24: 2016 WRT Sonora Open in  Hermosillo
  Polo Gutierrez def.  Alejandro Cardona, 15-8, 15-10.
 May 13 – 15: WRT Midwest Championships in  Minneapolis
  Alejandro Cardona def.  David Horn, 8-15, 15-10, 11-8.
  Alejandro Cardona /  Jaime Martell def.  David Horn /  Sebastian Franco, 11-15, 15-12, 11-5.
 June 15 – 18: Long Beach Open in  Long Beach
  Rodrigo Montoya /  Teobaldo Fumero A. def.  Carlos Keller Vargas /  Roland Keller, 15-5, 15-13.
 August 18 – 21: San Luis Open in  San Luis Potosí
 Winner:  Javier Mar
 Doubles winners:  Andree Parrilla &  Rodrigo Montoya
 September 15 – 18: Atlanta Open in  Atlanta
 Singles:  Andree Parrilla defeated  Polo Gutierrez, 15-11, 15-14.
 Doubles:  Andree Parrilla &  David Horn defeated  Justus Benson &  Jaime Martell, 15-15, 15-3, 11-6.
 October 28 – 30: Del Lago Open in  Matamoros
  Jaime Martell defeated  David Horn 12-15, 15-12, 11-6.
  Jaime Martell &  David defeated  Alejandro Cardona &  Rodrigo Montoya, from windrawn.
 December 2 – 4: Monterrey Open in  Monterrey
 Singles:  Edson Martinez defeated  Javier Mar, 11-6, 11-5, 11-1.
 December 8 – 11: Alamo City Open in  San Antonio
 Singles:  Alejandro Landa defeated  Alejandro Cardona, 15-6, 15-10.
 Doubles:  Alejandro Landa &  Felipe Camacho defeated  Andree Parrilla &  Rodrigo Montoya, 12-15, 15-13, 11-4.

2015–16 International Racquetball Tour

 July 10, 2015 – August 14, 2016: 2015–16 International Racquetball Tour
 September 17–20: Novasors Ghost of Georgetown Kansas City Open in  Kansas City
  Kane Waselenchuk def.  Rocky Carson 11-5, 11-0, 11-13, 11-2 
 October 7 – 11: UnitedHealthcare US OPEN Racquetball Championships in  Minneapolis
  Kane Waselenchuk def.  Daniel De La Rosa 11-5, 11-8, 11-3 to win his 11th UnitedHealthCare US Open Title.
  Ben Croft /  Kane Waselenchuk def.  Jake Bredenbeck /  Jose Diaz 15-0, 15-5.
 October 22–25: Krowning Moment & Bobcat Open in  San Marcos
  Kane Waselenchuk def.  Rocky Carson 11-6, 11-3, 11-2.
 October 29 – November 1: Galaxy Custom Printing IRT Pro/Am in  Lilburn
  Álvaro Beltrán def.  Rocky Carson 11-8, 8-11, 11-5, 11-4.
 November 5–8: Red Swain Shootout in  Davison
  Rocky Carson def.  Jose Rojas 11-2, 11-2, 11-8
 November 12–15: 25th Annual Turkey Shootout in  Garden City
  Kane Waselenchuk def.  Rocky Carson 11-3, 11-3, 11-8.
 November 19–22: St. Louis Pro Racquetball Winter Rollout in  St. Louis
  Kane Waselenchuk def.  Rocky Carson 11-2, 11-5, 11-2.
 January 14–17: NYC Open 17th Annual IRT Pro Stop in  Long Island
  Kane Waselenchuk def.  Rocky Carson 11-7, 11-5, 11-2.
 January 21–24: Lewis Drug Pro/Am in  Sioux Falls
  Kane Waselenchuk def.  Jose Rojas 12-10, 11-1, 11-6.
  Álvaro Beltrán /  Rocky Carson def.  Felipe Camacho /  Daniel De La Rosa 15-7, 15-3.
 March 10 – 13: Shamrock Shootout Pro/AM in  Lombard 
  Kane Waselenchuk def.  Daniel De La Rosa 11-2, 11-4, 11-2.
 March 31 – April 3: 2016 Raising Some Racquet for Kids in  Huber Heights
  Rocky Carson def.  Álvaro Beltrán 11-7, 9-11, 11-6, 8-11, 11-9.
 April 28 - May 1: Florida IRT Pro/Am in  Sarasota
  Rocky Carson def.  Daniel De La Rosa 5-11, 7-11, 11-8, 11-4, 11-1.
 May 12 – 15: ProKennex Tournament of Champions in  Portland
  Kane Waselenchuk def.  Daniel De La Rosa 5-11, 11-9, 11-3, 11-3.
 May 19 – 22: Coast to Coast California IRT Open in  Reseda (final)
  Kane Waselenchuk def.  Daniel De La Rosa 11-4, 11-2, 11-0.

2015–16 Ladies Professional Racquetball Tour

 August 28, 2015 – May 15, 2016: 2015–16 Ladies Professional Racquetball Tour
 August 28–30: Cali Open in  Cali
  Paola Longoria def.  Maria Jose Vargas 11-13, 11-2, 11-6, 11-3.
  Paola Longoria /  Samantha Salas def.  Michelle Key /  Frédérique Lambert 10-15, 15-0, 11-5.
 September 24–27: 3 Wall Ball World Championships in  Las Vegas
  Paola Longoria def.  Janel Tisinger 15-11, 15-12, 11-6.
  Paola Longoria /  Michelle Key def.  Aimee Ruiz /  Janel Tisinger 15-11, 15-10.
 October 7–11: UnitedHealthcare US OPEN Racquetball Championships in  Minneapolis
  Paola Longoria def.  Rhonda Rajsich 11-7, 11-5, 9-11, 11-9.
  Paola Longoria /  Samantha Salas def.  Alejandra Herrera /  Monserrat Mejia 15-10, 15-2.
 October 30 – November 1: 2015 Paola Longoria Experience in  San Luis Potosí City
  Paola Longoria def.  Maria Jose Vargas 11-0, 11-1, 11-5.
  Paola Longoria /  Samantha Salas def.  Susana Acosta /  Jessica Parrilla 15-7, 15-5
 November 13–15: 2015 Paola Longoria Invitational in  Monterrey
  Paola Longoria def.  Rhonda Rajsich 9-11, 11-8, 11-1, 11-2.
  Sheryl Lotts /  Rhonda Rajsich def.  Michelle Key /  Frédérique Lambert 15-11, 15-14.
 December 11–13: 24th Annual NES Associates Christmas Pro Am in  Arlington County
  Paola Longoria def.  Maria Jose Vargas 11-1, 11-1, 11-0.
  Alejandra Herrera  /  Paola Longoria def.  Susana Acosta /  Samantha Salas 15-8, 15-13.
 January 29–31: Mercedes-Benz of Cincinnati Pro Am in  Cincinnati
  Paola Longoria def.  Rhonda Rajsich 11-3, 11-8, 11-4.
  Paola Longoria /  Samantha Salas def.  Michelle Key /  Frédérique Lambert 15-3, 15-3.
 February 19–21: Winter Classic in  Overland Park
  Paola Longoria def.  Frédérique Lambert 11-2, 11-2, 11-4.
  Frédérique Lambert /  Sofia Rascon def.  Alejandra Herrera /  Monserrat Mejia 15-13, 15-4.
 March 4–6: New Jersey Open in  Warren Township
  Paola Longoria def.  Rhonda Rajsich 11-6, 7-11, 11-4, 11-2.
  Frédérique Lambert /  Paola Longoria def.  Aimee Ruiz /  Maria Jose Vargas 15-12, 13-15, 11-4.
 April 1–3: AZ WOR VII Final Battle in  Glendale
 Round Robin: 1.  Rhonda Rajsich, 2.  Michelle Key, 3.  Adrianna Moncada, 4.  Susie Boulanger
 April 22–24: Battle at the Alamo in  San Antonio
 Men's Singles:  Daniel de la Rosa def.  Jansen Allen 11-3, 11-8, 1-11, 11-9.
 Women's Singles:  Paola Longoria def.  Maria Jose Vargas 11-8, 11-5, 11-6.
 Women's Doubles:  Paola Longoria /  Samantha Salas def.  Jessica Parrilla /  Rhonda Rajsich 15-4, 15-6.
 May 12 – 15: Dare 2 Dream Racquetball Championships in  Stockton
  Paola Longoria def.  Rhonda Rajsich 11-5, 9-11, 10-11, 11-3, 11-1.
 June 7 – 11: Formulaflow Pro Am in  Cochabamba
 June 10 – 12: Tour Rosa Mexicano in  Veracruz (final)
 Women's Singles:  Paola Longoria def.  Frédérique Lambert 6-11, 11-6, 3-11, 11-9, 11-2.
 Women's Doubles:  Paola Longoria /  Samantha Salas def.  Frédérique Lambert /  María Renée Rodríguez 15-5, 10-15, 11-8.

References

 
Racquetball by year
racquetball